J. D. Evermore is an American actor. He is known for playing the role of Thomas Silby in Treme, Detective Lutz in True Detective, Harley in The Walking Dead, Carl Daggett in Rectify, Holt in Maggie, and as Dewey Revette in Deepwater Horizon.

Filmography

References

External links

1968 births
Living people
American male film actors
American male television actors
People from Greenville, Mississippi
Male actors from Mississippi
20th-century American male actors
21st-century American male actors